Bengaluru (Kannada: ಬೆಂಗಳೂರು ) is the capital and the largest city of the Indian state of Karnataka. It is India's third largest city and fifth largest metropolitan area. Modern Bengaluru was founded in 1537 CE by Kempe Gowda, a vassal of the Vijayanagara Empire. Kempe Gowda built a mud fort in the vicinity of modern Bengaluru. By 1831, the city was incorporated into the British Raj with the establishment of the Bangalore Cantonment. The British returned dominion of the city to the King of Mysore, choosing however, to retain jurisdiction over the cantonment. Therefore, Bengaluru essentially became a twin city, with civic and infrastructural developments of the cantonment conforming to European styles of planning.  For most of the period after Indian independence in 1947, Bengaluru was a B-1 status city, and was not considered to be one of India's "4 major metropolitan cities". The growth of Information Technology in the city, which is the largest contributor to India's software exports, has led to a decadal growth that is second to only that of India's capital New Delhi. The city's roads, however, were not designed to accommodate the vehicular traffic, growing at an average of 8% annually, that prevails in Bengaluru. This leads to heavy slow traffic and traffic jams in Bengaluru Bangalore continues to fall behind in this area, and foreign visitors are often shocked to see the state of infrastructure, but now things are improving thanks to heavy investment of the Karnataka Government in infra projects. This is the main problem from migration of people from other states.

Early city planning and infrastructure
Within the fort built by Kempe Gowda I, the town was divided into petes or localities such as Chikpete, Dodpete and Balepete, with each area intended for different artisans and tradesman. Markets within the town were divided by the nature of the provisions supplied and services rendered – Aralpete, Akkipete, Ragipete, Balepete and Taragupete sold various provisions while Kumbarpete, Ganginarpete, Upparpete, Nagartharapete catered to services.  The town within the fort had two main streets – Chikpete street and Dodpete street. Chikpete street ran east–west and Dodpete street ran north–south. Their intersection formed the heart of the town – Dodpete square. The town within the fort was cordoned by nine gates. The four main gates of the fort were Halasuru (east), Sondekoppa (west), Yelahanka (north) and Anekal (south). Kempe Gowda encouraged the construction of temples and residential areas, known as agraharas within the town. Kempe Gowda I sanctioned the construction of lakes within the landlocked city, to provide for a source of water supply. The city's residential areas further developed under Kempe Gowda II, who built four towers to demarcate Bangalore's boundaries. These towers in the modern localities of Lal Bagh, Kempambudhi Tank, Ulsoor lake, and the vicinity of Ramana Maharshi Ashram. In 1758, Bangalore was given as a jahagir to Haider Ali, Commander-in-chief of the Mysore army.  Haider Ali built the Delhi and Mysore gates of the fort and further strengthened it with stone walls. The Lal Bagh botanical garden was established in the city during the reigns of Haider Ali and his son, Tipu Sultan. Captured by the British after the Fourth Anglo-Mysore War in 1799, Bangalore fell into the dominion of the British Raj.  The Diwan of Mysore, Poornaiah, contributed to the development of Bangalore's infrastructure between 1799 and 1811 CE.  He renovated the temple inside the fort and built a choultry for travellers in Tulasi Thota.  The British moved their garrison from Srirangapatna to Bangalore in 1831, establishing the Bangalore Cantonment. The officer in charge of the city was known as Huzoor Shirastedar.  Sir Mark Cubbon, commissioner of the city from 1834 to 1861, was responsible for introducing Kannada as the official language and for sanctioning the construction of roads and bridges, as well as setting up the telegraph system in the city.

The South Parade, today known as M.G. Road, became a fashionable area with bars, and restaurants. In his book Bangalore: Scenes from an Indian City, M. N. Srinivas opines that the reasons leading to the haphazard development of narrow, winding roads around the civilian areas around the cantonment was because the British chose to ignore the development of these areas, which were normally reserved for non-European labourers. The first railway lines between Bangalore and Jolarpet were laid in 1864 under the directives of Cubbon. His successor, Lewin Bentham Bowring (1862–1870) established the first organised law enforcement units in the city as well the sewerage system and the department of Survey and Settlement. In 1862, the Town Municipality of Bangalore was constituted under Act No. XXVI of 1850. The municipality board, comprising two European officials, four local officials and two non-officials met biweekly to discuss matters on the city's sanitation and improvement. The jurisdiction of the municipality included Balepet, Manavarthpet and Halsurpet. The first project of the municipality was the construction of a moat around the ramparts of the old Bangalore fort. In 1866, the municipality installed kerosene lamps on principal streets. A parallel municipality was established in the Bangalore Cantonment in 1862 with Rs. 37,509. The jurisdiction of the cantonment municipality included the Ulsoor division, Southern division, East General Bazaar division, West General Bazaar division, Cleveland Town division and High Ground division. Though the Bangalore town and the Cantonment had separate municipal bodies, they both reported to the President of Bangalore Town Municipality. Despite the establishment of municipal bodies, civic infrastructure in the city did not see considerable improvement. Contractors of the municipality subordinated farmers for the removal of filth in the cantonment, which they in turn, used as manure. The efficacy of this agreement was minimal during agricultural seasons. Contractors engaged in building construction employing more than 10 labourers, were required to maintain a latrine for their use and clean it daily.

The bubonic plague of 1897–98 had a dramatic effect on the improvements of sanitation and health facilities. Telephone lines were laid to help coordinate anti-plague operations. To prevent the spread of the epidemic, several unsanitary houses were demolished, and with a lack of manpower to accomplish the demolitions, convicts from the Central Jail were requisitioned. This extension was later named Chamarajendrapet. A similar extension was formed in the north of the city, called Sheshadripuram, after Diwam Sheshadri Iyer. The relieve the city of congestion, two new extensions, Malleswaram and Basavanagudi were formed. New roads were constructed linking the new localities and wards of the city during this time. The Avenue Road, so called because of being lined by trees on either side, was the commercial hub of the city. The B.V.K. Iyengar Road was constructed as a direct tributary of the Mysore Road. The silver jubilee park near K.R. Market was laid to commemorate the silver jubilee of the accession of the king of Mysore, Krishnaraja Wodeyar IV in 1927. The road on one side of the park was named Silver Jubilee road and Narasimharaja Road on the other. Anand Rao Circle was laid in honour of the Mysore Diwan, while Sajjan Rao Circle was named after a philanthropist. In August 1948, the Governor General of India, C. Rajagopalachari inaugurated the Jayanagar extension, named after the last ruler of the Kingdom of Mysore, Jayachamrajendra Wodeyar. On 3 July 1949, the industrial suburb of the city was inaugurated by the Maharajah of Mysore and was named Rajajinagar. In 1905, Bangalore became the first city in India to be electrified, powered by the hydroelectric plant in Shivanasamudra.

Development after independence

 After Indian independence in 1947, the two municipalities of the cantonment and Bangalore town were united under the Bangalore Municipal Corporation Act LXIX (1949) to form a single municipality for the city – the Bangalore City Corporation (BCC).  The new corporation consisted of 50 wards and 75 councillors.  The first elections to the BCC under adult franchise were held in December 1950, with Congress party candidate R. Anantharaman elected as first mayor of independent Bangalore.  The needs of a growing city led to the rapid growth of civic bodies in the city.  The BDA Act of 1976 reconstituted and reorganised the City Improvement Trust Board to form the Bangalore Development Authority (BDA), whose objective was to ensure proper planning and development of the metropolitan area. Bangalore's city layout today has various types of "growth poles", consisting of Markets – K.R. Market, Malleshwaram, Magadi Road, Ulsoor and others, Commercial Centres – Gandhi Bazaar, MG Road, Brigade Road, Commercial streets among others, Industrial layouts – Electronics City, Bharat Electronics Limited layout and HAL Layout, and other socio-economic precursors – Hospitals (Mallya, Bowring and Lady Curson, Vanivilas) and areas of religious and ethnic concentration.

The Bangalore Water Supply and Sewerage Board (BWSSB) was constituted in 1968 to supply water to the city and to provide for the disposal of sewage.  The Karnataka Electricity Board (KEB) was formed in 1957.  Losses in revenues through the mid-1980s and 1990s prompted the Karnataka Legislature to pass the Karnataka Electricity Reforms Act in 1999, which corporatised the KEB into the Karnataka Power Transmission Corporation Limited (KPTCL), with the distribution of Bangalore division vested with the Bangalore Electricity Supply Company Limited (BESCOM), which caters to 2.1 million customers in the Bangalore metropolitan area. To cater to the electricity needs of a growing population, BESCOM has sought to commission 11 additional 66/11 kV substations. Over 4,000 distribution transformer centres were added.  One survey indicates that 94% of citizens were satisfied with BESCOM's performance.  However, Bangalore continues to experience residential and industrial power outages ("load shedding") for as long as 2 to 4 hours a day, while its contemporaries such as Chennai and Hyderabad remain largely free of such outages.

The Bangalore Metropolitan Transport Corporation (BMTC) was separated from the parent Karnataka State Road Transport Corporation through private sector investment, first making a profit of Rs. 267 million (US$5.6 million in 2001–2002.  As of 2001, the company operated close to 3000 regular and Pushpak busses and services 2.8 million customers daily. The Bangalore Agenda Task Force (BATF), a private-public partnership enterprise, was established during the S. M. Krishna administration to coordinate civic improvement and development activities with the BDA and BMP.  The BATF, along with other civic bodies identified ten junctions and roads for upgrade and improvement, including the Bannerghatta ring road junction, toll gate junction and the Airport Inner Ring Road Junction.

Under the leadership of Sir Mirza Ismail, Diwan of Mysore, the Hindustan Aeronautics Limited (HAL), a public sector undertaking was established in Bangalore for the purposes of research and development of fighter aircraft in the 1940s.  The HAL operated an airport for test-flights. The Directorate General of Civil Aviation (DGCA) obtained a small piece of land, known as Civil Enclave for the construction of a civil airport terminal in the HAL airport for handling peak-hour traffic of 300 passengers. By 1991, peak-hour traffic to Bangalore had increased to 1,800 passengers, making HAL the fourth busiest airport in the country by 2004. When a tender was issued in 1991 by the Government of Karnataka for the construction of the Bangalore International Airport, HAL decided to discontinue civil aviation service. This led to a prolonged three way tussle for operational ownership between the HAL, the Government of Karnataka. Construction of the Bangalore International Airport (BIAL) was repeatedly delayed due to a lack of agreement between successive administrations and the private consortium over operational ownership of the international airport and the status of HAL airport upon the completion of construction of the international airport. Clearance for the construction of the US$288 million airport was eventually granted in June 2004. The major stakeholders of this project include Siemens, Zurich Airport, Larsen & Toubro consortium, Airports Authority of India and Karnataka State Investment and Industrial Development Corporation. Construction work on the airport began in March 2005.

Bangalore's road network exceeds 3,000 km (1,800 mi) and consists of ring roads, arterial roads, sub-arterial roads and residential streets. The city road network is mainly radial, converging in the centre. The main roads of Bangalore coming into the city include Bellary Road in the north, Tumkur Road and Mysore Road in the west, Kanakpura Road, Bannerghatta Road and Hosur Road in the south and Airport Road and Old Madras Road in the east. Many of Bangalore's erstwhile colonial and town streets were developed into commercial and entertainment areas after independence. The B.V.K Iyengar Road became the retail hub of Bangalore, while MG Road, Commercial Street and Brigade Road became important shopping, recreation and corporate areas. Consequently, traffic increased, especially on MG Road, which forms the main artery for the city's east–west traffic. But for MG Road, other roads in and around the erstwhile Parade Ground remain narrow, winding roads. Bangalore's vehicular traffic has increased manifold, with 1.6 million registered vehicles in the city – the second highest for an Indian city, after New Delhi. The maintenance and construction of roads to address the growing traffic in the city has been a challenge to the BDA and the BMP. Development of the city road infrastructure has revolved around imposing one-way traffic in certain areas, improving traffic flow in junctions, constructing ring roads, bridges, and other grade separators. Six high volume junctions were identified for improvements, through a public-private partnership involving corporate sponsors and various state government agencies, such as the Siddapur Road and Hosur Road junction, sponsored by Infosys and the Airport Road and Intermediate Ring Road junction sponsored by the TATAs. Flyovers were constructed in the city to ease traffic congestion. Newer flyovers were planned for the city for 2006 and beyond The construction of flyovers near the Domlur sector was delayed twice while the flyover near the Jayadeva Institute of Cardiology on Bannerghatta Road was also delayed.

Some of the flyovers and one-ways mitigated the traffic situation moderately, however the volume of traffic continues to grow at an annual rate of between 7–10%. Roads near Airport Road and the residential areas in Koramangala were dug up for renovation but have remained in this state for over two years. The Outer Ring Road was initially constructed to ease truck congestion in the city, however the growth of suburbs reduced the positive impact of the ring road. Bangalore Development Authority is laying additional lanes on many of the major roads around Bangalore. The Peripheral Ring Road, expected to be completed in 2007, is designed to be concentric to the Outer Ring Road and covers 108.9 km. The Hosur Road, which connects Bangalore to the Electronics City, is heavily congested and is part of the National Highway (NH7), therefore witnesses heavy truck traffic as well.

Rapid population growth in Bangalore was brought about by the IT and other associated industries, leading to an increase in the vehicular population to about 1.5 million, with an annual growth rate of 7–10%. Bangalore's infrastructural woes have led to protests by students and IT workers in the city. In July 2004 Wipro's CEO Azim Premji threatened to pull his company out of the city unless there was a drastic improvement in infrastructure over the next few years, stating "We do not see the situation (state of Bangalore's infrastructure) improving in the near future". Ideological clashes between the city's IT moguls, who demand addressing of the infrastructural problems of the city, and the successive state governments, whose electoral base is primarily rural Karnataka's agricultural workers, are common In 2005, however, the Central and state governments allocated sizeable funding from their annual budgets towards the improvement of Bangalore's infrastructure.

References and notes

Further reading 

 

Economy of Bangalore
Infrastructure in India